Welcome to Alflolol is volume four in the French comic book (or bande dessinée) science fiction series Valérian and Laureline created by writer Pierre Christin and artist Jean-Claude Mézières.

Synopsis

Valérian and Laureline are departing the Earth colony Technorog following a tour of inspection. Passing through the protective shield that surrounds the planet, Laureline is suddenly enveloped in a blue flame and rendered cataleptic. Recovering she reveals that she could hear what sounded like a cry for help. Checking their tracking instruments, they find an alien spacecraft falling towards Technorog. It strikes the protective shield and bounces into the asteroid belt that rings the planet. Valérian and Laureline spacewalk to the alien ship which they find deserted. Suddenly, Laureline is again rendered cataleptic and this time floats out of the spacecraft and into the asteroids. Following, Valérian finds Laureline surrounded by a group of strange aliens. The lead alien, unable to bring Laureline round, moves to open her spacesuit. Valérian intervenes. The lead alien introduces himself, using telepathy, as Argol, He-Who-Has-The-Gift-Of-Speaking-In-Minds. His family's maternal ancestor, Garol, She-Who-Has-The-Gift-Of-Taking-Over-Minds, has fallen gravely ill. In an attempt to get help she has taken over Laureline's mind but is now too sick to free her. Argol's wife, Orgal, She-Who-Has-The-Gift-Of-Making-Things-Move-Through-Space, used her telekinetic powers to bring Laureline to them. Valérian offers to bring them back to his astroship to see if he can cure Garol's illness. On the way, Argol introduces the rest of his family: his son Lagor and daughter Logar, who haven't yet discovered their gifts, and the Goumon, their pet. He explains that they come from the planet below them which is called Alflolol and that they have been away exploring other worlds. Valérian tells him that the planet below him is called Technorog and belongs to Earth. Argol laughs and says his people have just been away on a little trip. Valérian estimates their "little trip" has lasted 4,000 years. Algol explains that his people live for hundreds of thousands of years. Reaching the astroship, Valérian takes them to its medical unit where he manages to stabilise Garol's condition. Laureline recovers, much to the delight of the Goumon which has taken a shine to her. Valérian contacts the Governor of Technorog requesting permission to return to the planet.

As the astroship flies over the surface of their planet, the Alflololians are dumbfounded by the activities of human settlers – the salt extraction plants on the ocean, the mines, the factories and the hydroponic plantations. They are even more dismayed when they discover that the humans have built their capital, Technorogville, on top of where they had their campsite. Landing, the guards that greet them demand that the Alflololians are put through sanitary control. Laureline goes with them while Valérian goes to the Governor's office. He explains to the Governor that Technorog's original inhabitants have returned and  that, under Galaxity's laws, they have the right to return to the land that is theirs. The Governor wants to refer the matter to Technorog's council before making a decision. Suddenly, the door opens and Laureline arrives with the Alflololians. At the same time, alarms start going off all around the city – chaos has broken out as the automatic control systems have broken down. Laureline admits that the Alflololians had been having a bit of fun before they came to the Governor's office which they have come to claim as their own since it lies on the exact spot they lived on before they departed. Left with no choice, the Governor leaves them to it and Algol and his family begin celebrating their return. The party lasts for several days and, eventually, Valérian and Laureline, exhausted, fall asleep in the corridor outside.

Waking up, the pair find the Alflololians have gone. Algol has left a message – the city doesn't agree with them and they have set out for their traditional hunting grounds. The Governor arrives with the rest of the council. He orders Valérian and Laureline to lead an expedition to bring them back – at least, up to now, they knew where the Alflololians were and what they were doing. Now, they present a threat to industrial production. The Governor provides the best men and equipment but they prove no match for the harsh environment and soon, their equipment destroyed, the last of the able-bodied men are forced to turn back leaving Valérian and Laureline alone in the jungle. Making camp, they soon fall asleep but, suddenly, Laureline is grabbed by a huge tentacled beast and borne away into the jungle. Valérian gives chase and follows them out of the jungle to the shores of Magnet Ocean. Left with no choice, Valérian draws his gun and prepares to fire, hoping he won't hit Laureline. Suddenly, from out of nowhere, the Goumon appears and attacks the creature. Valérian drags Laureline out of the water as Argol and the rest of the family arrive but she has fallen sick – the creature is a Shalafut-Personality-Splitter. Suddenly, Logar stands over Laureline and cures her. Algol is delighted – his daughter has found her gift – he tells her she will henceforth be known as Logar, She-Who-Saves-From-Nasty-Beasts. He invites Valérian and Laureline to accompany them on their boat where his son, Lagor, will be taught how to kill his first Furutz, one of the vicious sea creatures that inhabits the ocean.

On the boat, on the hunt, they close in on a herd of Furutz swimming near the salt extraction plants when suddenly a squadron of aircraft fly over them. Valérian's radio crackles into life and the Governor's voice orders them to withdraw from the area as it is restricted. Algol warns them to get clear – a panicked herd of Furutz can cause untold damage. The Governor ignores them and opens fire. The Furutz are enraged and attack the salt extraction plants causing spectacular damage. Somehow, in the middle of the devastation, Lagor manages to make the kill and the Alflololians drag the huge beast onto the shore. The Governor and his men land. The situation has gotten worse – a hundred Alflololian families have now arrived and are demanding to be allowed to return to their home. Laureline is horrified to discover that the Governor plans to put them on a reservation. Valérian is left in charge of administering the new arrangement.

The reservation is on the edge of the desert near some factories on the worst hunting grounds on the planet. There is little game and all the food is contaminated by the pollution from the factories. Hunting becomes impossible when the sirocco winds blow from the desert. With the Alflololians on the brink of starvation, Valérian convinces the council to give them food-aid. But there is a price – the Alflololians must work for their food. This is the last straw for Laureline who leaves Valérian and, throwing her lot in with the Alflololians, heads off to the hydroponic plantations with them. Fed up, Valérian sets up camp in the desert.

Some days later, he receives an urgent call from the Governor – a catastrophe has occurred at the hydroponic plantations. Arriving there, he discovers that all the foodstuffs have been transformed into pretty flowers. Algol informs him that his son has discovered his gift and will now be known as Lagor, He-Who-Has-The-Gift-Of-Making-Ugly-Things-Beautiful. Unfortunately, the flowers are not edible and the planet is now on the brink of starvation. The Governor has a new plan: the Alflololians will be split up – some to the mines, some to the factories, some to the power plants. Valérian refuses to comply with his new orders. The Governor threatens to inform Galaxity about Laureline's rebellious behaviour – if Valérian doesn't co-operate, Laureline will be dismissed from the Spatio-Temporal Service and will finish her days in the mines. Reluctantly, Valérian complies.

Several days later, Valérian begins a tour of inspection to see how the Alflololians are getting on. Arriving at a factory, he discovers that the spaceships they have been making have all been transformed into colourful sculptures. The situation is similar in the other factories – the atomic weapons factory can only make pocket-knives while at the biology centre, everyone has hay-fever. Moving on to the mines, he discovers that the drilling rigs are paralysed. Flying over the power plants he finds a huge fire raging. Reaching Technorogville, he finds it plunged in darkness due to a system-wide power cut. Entering the Governor's office, the council are in a state of despair – production has ground to a complete halt. Finally they agree that the Alflololians should be allowed to roam free on their own world.

Heading to the reservation to pass on the good news, Valérian is surprised to discover the Alflololians leaving in their spaceships. The only ones left are Algol and his family, who cannot leave because their ship is too badly damaged. Laureline is with them – she explains that the Alflololians had had enough and have chosen to return to travelling. Valérian offers Algol a lift in his astroship and Laureline finally makes up with him. Leading the flotilla of Alflololian ships through the protective shield, they say their farewells to the Governor who warns them never to come back. The Alflololian ships go their separate ways. Valérian takes Algol and his family to Galaxity, promising them there will be plenty to eat and drink and their celebrations will be appreciated. The high-ranking officials of Galaxity await them as ambassadors and prepare a reception for them.

Main characters
 Valérian, a spatio-temporal agent from Galaxity, future capital of Earth, in the 28th century
 Laureline, originally from France in the eleventh century, now a spatio-temporal agent of Galaxity in the 28th century
 The Governor of Technorog
 Argol, He-Who-Has-The-Gift-Of-Speaking-In-Minds, patriarch of the Alflololian family Valérian and Laureline befriend
 Orgal, She-Who-Has-The-Gift-Of-Making-Things-Move-Through-Space, wife of Argol
 Lagor, He-Who-Has-The-Gift-Of-Making-Ugly-Things-Beautiful, son of Argol and Orgal
 Logar, She-Who-Saves-From-Nasty-Beasts, daughter of Argol and Orgal
 Garol, She-Who-Has-The-Gift-Of-Taking-Over-Minds, maternal ancestor of Argol's family

Setting
The planet Alflolol, or Technorog as it is known by its human settlers, 28th century. Alflolol is a yellow/orange planet surrounded by a rocky asteroid belt. The planet has at least one ocean and a desert from which fierce sirocco winds blow across the surface. It rotates on its axis once every 60 Earth days. It has a single moon that rotates every 30 days.

The native Alflololians are few in number due to spontaneous birth control practices and are arranged in familial groups. Their life spans are very long compared with humans – approximately 25,000 Earth years. Each Alflololian is born with an individual paranormal gift, such as telepathy or telekinesis, which first begins to manifest during childhood  at around 2,500 to 3,500 years old. When this happens the young Alflololian's name changes to include a description of the gift – e.g. Argol, He-Who-Has-The-Gift-Of-Speaking-In-Minds. It is an important right-of-passage for a young Alflololian male to hunt and kill one of the cruel Furutz that swim in the ocean. Although highly intelligent, Alflololians generally have little interest in wealth or material goods and even less interest in work. They are, however, curious about other cultures and periodically leave their homeworld, in spacecraft pulled from the soil of Alflolol by their ancestors, to visit other worlds. These journeys can often last for thousands of Earth years and usually the entire population leaves together leaving their homeworld deserted.

The human settlers from Earth have come to Alflolol, which they have named Technorog, attracted by the valuable natural resources it offers. To provide protection, they have placed huge electro-magnetic relay beacons on the asteroids in the belt that rings the planet. When activated these beacons generate an impenetrable shield around the planet. Ingress and egress is only permitted to authorised spacecraft through a narrow channel that can be opened in the asteroid belt. Alflolol's harsh atmospheric conditions are harmful to humans if exposure to them is prolonged so they live under domes and wear protective clothing when working outside. The domes also simulate an Earth-like cycle of day and night. The capital city they have constructed is called Technorogville and it lies on a hill on the ancestral burial site of Argol's family. Nearby is a forest, known as Ananil to the Alflololians, which leads to the shores of the sea, named Magnet Ocean by the humans, where the settlers use floating platforms to extract magnetic salts which fuel the ultra-light motors of Galaxity's spacecraft. In the surrounding mountains, gigantic mines extract rare metals which are processed and used in manufacturing in the colossal factories that lie on the plains near the desert. Great hydroponic plantations are required to feed the workers who keep this vast enterprise going. The planet is administered by a technocrat Governor who reports to a council representing the business interests on the planet.

Notes
 The two key themes in this album – the ecological and sociological impact of industrial development and the treatment of indigenous peoples under colonialism – make this one of the most political of the Valérian albums. This is the first time in the series that Galaxity is portrayed in a less than favourable light and is used to hold a mirror up to modern Western society. 
 This album was translated into English by S. Baker and published in and 1983 by Dargaud USA in the United States and in 1984 by Hodder Dargaud Ltd in the United Kingdom

1972 graphic novels
Valérian and Laureline